Gargano is a historical and geographical sub-region in the province of Foggia, Apulia, southeast Italy.

Gargano may also refer to:

Gargano (surname)
Gargano National Park, a national park in Foggia, Italy
Gargano goat, or Garganica, a breed of domestic goat

See also
Ally & Gargano, a defunct American advertising agency